The Oranjestad Reef Islands lie just off the western coast of the island of Aruba, a constituent island nation of the Kingdom of the Netherlands in the Dutch Caribbean, adjacent to the central harbour of the capital Oranjestad. They form a 309 ha site encompassing sand and boulder coral islets, on a substrate of submerged reef, which can vary in size and shape following winter storms and hurricanes. The area has been identified as an Important Bird Area by BirdLife International as a breeding site for Sandwich and common terns.

References

Important Bird Areas of the Dutch Caribbean
Birds of Aruba
Seabird colonies
Oranjestad, Aruba